Peter J. Daniels (April 8, 1864 – February 13, 1928), nicknamed "Smiling Pete", was an Irish born professional baseball player who played pitcher in the Major Leagues from 1891 to 1898. He played for the Pittsburgh Alleghenys and St. Louis Browns.

External links

1864 births
1928 deaths
Major League Baseball pitchers
St. Louis Browns (NL) players
Pittsburgh Alleghenys players
19th-century baseball players
Minor league baseball managers
St. Joseph Reds players
Wichita Braves players
Danville Browns players
Quincy Black Birds players
Dallas Tigers players
Quincy Ravens players
Mobile Blackbirds players
Kansas City Cowboys (minor league) players
Kansas City Blues (baseball) players
Columbus Senators players
Omaha Omahogs players
St. Joseph Saints players
Grand Rapids Furniture Makers players
Springfield Wanderers players
Rockford Rough Riders players
Anderson Anders players
Youngstown Little Giants players
Marion Glass Blowers players
Fort Wayne Railroaders players
Decatur Commodores players
Major League Baseball players from Ireland
Irish baseball players
Sportspeople from County Cavan
Irish emigrants to the United States (before 1923)